(Japanese: "old teacher"; "old master") is a title in Zen Buddhism with different usages depending on sect and country. In Rinzai Zen, the term is reserved only for individuals who have received inka shōmei, meaning they have completed the entire kōan curriculum; this amounts to a total of fewer than 100 people at any given time. In Sōtō Zen and Sanbo Kyodan it is used more loosely. This is especially the case in the United States and Europe, where almost any teacher who has received dharma transmission might be called rōshi, or even use it to refer to themselves, a practice unheard of in Japan.

Etymology
The Japanese rōshi is a translation of the more antiquated Chinese Laozi (Wade-Giles; Lao Tzu) meaning 'Old Master' and connoting the archetype of a wise old man. The modern Chinese 老師/老师 (Chinese ) is a common word for teacher or professor without the religious or spiritual connotation of rōshi. Chinese Chán Buddhism (Zen is the Japanese transliteration of Chán) uses the semantically related title 師父/师父 or Mandarin shīfu (Cantonese "sifu), literally "master father" or "father of masters", or 師傅/师傅, literally "master teacher" or "teacher of masters"; both pronounced "shīfu" in Mandarin) as an honorific title for the highest masters, but it also may be used in respectful address of monks and nuns generally.

Usage

Traditionally, the term  rōshi has been applied as a respectful honorific to a significantly older Zen teacher considered to have matured in wisdom and to have attained a superior understanding and expression of the Dharma (Japanese: mujōdō no taigen) . Typically, a rōshi will have received dharma transmission (Jap: inka shōmei) many years ago and although often the abbot or spiritual director of a monastery may in fact be too old to carry these responsibilities.

Despite this historical reality, it has come in some modern Zen schools to be applied as a general title for a teacher regardless of the age of the individual who receives it. This is especially true in the United States and Europe where it appears that some confusion has arisen where the word rōshi has been conflated with the term oshō, which is the generic term for a Soto Buddhist teacher who has received shiho and completed her or his basic training. Historically, the term rōshi will only be applied to an oshō after they have given many years of service as a teacher.

Rinzai
In some Rinzai organizations, a monastic is sometimes called rōshi after they have received inka shōmei, meaning they have completed kōan study and received Dharma transmission from their master;

According to roshi Sokun Tsushimoto, the title of rōshi is equivalent to Zen master and shike:

Sōtō
In the Sōtō organization, a person is sometimes called rōshi after they have received the title of shike, but this is by no means standard practice:

Western Zen
Many Zen communities in the United States confer the honorific title of rōshi to their teachers as a regular title, in deference to perceived Japanese Zen tradition. In most western instances it is used synonymously with the term Zen master, which has a quite specific meaning in Japan, namely the select group of persons who are qualified to supervise the headtemples and monk training halls.

In the west, Rinzai and Soto-uses of the term have been mixed:

In the Sanbo Kyodan, a lay organization that combines Soto and Rinzai elements, a person is called rōshi when they have received inka, indicating they have passed the kōan curriculum and received Dharma transmission.

Criticism
The use of the term rōshi in the U.S. and Europe has at times led to confusion and controversy. Stuart Lachs has argued that Zen institutions in the West have often attributed a mythic status to the title rōshi with harmful consequences.

See also
 Dharma transmission
 Oshō
 Sensei
 Zen master
 Zen ranks and hierarchy

References

Web references

Sources

External links
 Buddhadharma, Dharma Dictionary, Roshi

Japanese Buddhist titles
Zen